The Argentine Normalization and Certification Institute (IRAM) is the International Organization for Standardization (ISO) member body for Argentina.

It was founded on May 2, 1935, under the name Instituto Argentino de Racionalización de Materiales, IRAM, and is still known as IRAM even though its name was changed in 1996 to Argentine Normalization and Certification Institute.

The organization has branches in various provinces throughout Argentina.

External links 
ISO member body information
Official website

References 

Argentina
Scientific organisations based in Argentina
Organizations established in 1935
1935 establishments in Argentina